is a train station located in Ogōri, Fukuoka.

Lines 
Nishi-Nippon Railroad
Tenjin Ōmuta Line

Platforms

Adjacent stations

Surrounding area
 Fukuoka Prefectural Road 88
 Mikuni Elementary School
 Mikuni Nursery
 Nishi-Nippon City Bank
 Ogōri Swimming School

Railway stations in Fukuoka Prefecture
Railway stations in Japan opened in 1924